Tobi 2 - Coptic Calendar - Tobi 4

The third day of the Coptic month of Tobi, the fifth month of the Coptic year. On a common year, this day corresponds to December 29, of the Julian Calendar, and January 11, of the Gregorian Calendar. This day falls in the Coptic season of Peret, the season of emergence.

Commemorations

Saints 

 The martyrdom of the Children of Bethlehem

References 

Days of the Coptic calendar